This article details the fixtures and results of the Myanmar national under-23 football team.

2017

2018

References 

under-23
National under-23 association football team results